Barbara Stcherbatcheff (born 1981 in Chicago, Illinois, US) is an American author, journalist and economic commentator. After launching a banking career in the City of London, she started writing the weekly City Girl column in the Thelondonpaper.  She regularly contributes to Newsweek and other publications.

Bibliography
She has discussed her book, "Confessions of a City Girl" (Random House, 2009) on numerous television and radio channels, including BBC Business, Six O'Clock News, ITV, and Ten O'Clock News, Sky News, the BBC News Channel, BBC1's The Big Questions with Nicky Campbell, BBC Radio, BBC Radio Five Live, LBC radio, the BBC World Service, Bloomberg and Al Jazeera English.  Her book has been translated into German and Polish.

Personal life
Stcherbatcheff grew up in Woodstock, Illinois.

References

1981 births
Living people
Writers from Chicago
People from Woodstock, Illinois